Events in the year 1946 in Turkey.

Parliament
 7th Parliament of Turkey (up to 5 August)
 8th Parliament of Turkey

Incumbents
President – İsmet İnönü 
Prime Minister
 Şükrü Saracoğlu ( up to 7 August)
Recep Peker (from 7 August)
Leader of the opposition
Celal Bayar (from 7 January)

Ruling party and the main opposition
 Ruling party – Republican People's Party (CHP)
 Main opposition – Democrat Party (DP)

Cabinet
 14th government of Turkey (up to 7 August)
 15th government of Turkey (from 7 August)

Events
7 January – Democrat Party (DP) was founded
29 March – Treaty with Iraq
5 April –  carried the remains of the Turkish Ambassador to the United States, Münir Ertegün, from New York to İstanbul
31 May – 1946 Varto–Hınıs earthquake
 21 July – General elections (CHP 396 seats, DP 61 seats, Independents7 seats)
8 August – Soviet Union proposed to change the status of the straits
21 October – Turkey rejected Soviet proposal 
7 September – Devaluation
18 December – DP boycotted the parliament (ended on the 26th of December)

Births
12 February – Ajda Pekkan, actress and singer
14 February – Kemal Unakıtan, politician
4 April – Ercan Yazgan, theatre actor
19 April – Duygu Asena, journalist
5 May – Aydın Menderes, Adnan Menderes’ son, politician
24 May – Tansu Çiller, prime minister (50th, 51st, and (52nd government of Turkey)
20 June – Zülfü Livaneli, musician, politician and journalist
3 August – Cahit Berkay, musician
10 November – Fikret Kızılok, singer 
14 December – Oral Çalışlar, politician and journalist

Deaths
9 July – Nevzat Tandoğan (born 1894, suicide) – governor of Ankara
26 November – Saffet Arıkan (born 1888), former government minister

Gallery

References

 
Years of the 20th century in Turkey